In the United States, a backcountry or backwater is a geographical area that is remote, undeveloped, isolated, or difficult to access.

Terminology

Backcountry and wilderness within United States national parks
The National Park Service (NPS) generally uses the term "backcountry" to refer to "primitive, undeveloped portions of parks". Developments within backcountry areas are generally limited to trails, unpaved roads, and administrative facilities associated with dispersed recreational use. Dispersed recreational use is the most prevalent human use in backcountry areas, although research activities may also occur.

The NPS defines wilderness within US national parks as any "backcountry areas which have been specifically designated as part of the National Wilderness Preservation System or any other area that has been determined to possess the characteristics of wilderness as defined by Section 2(c) of the Wilderness Act". Section 2(c) states in part that wilderness:

Wilderness lands within US national parks are a subset of all backcountry lands. Wilderness and backcountry lands also exist outside of US national parks on public lands managed by the US Forest Service, the Bureau of Land Management, and the US Fish and Wildlife Service.

Use of the term "backcountry" in New Zealand
In New Zealand, "backcountry" often refers to land that is not accessible by public access. For example, it is common for a farmer to have some remote parts of their land left in scrubland or forest. This is often adjacent to other areas of backcountry which are yet to be developed or protected from development. Trampers and other explorers sometimes need to get farmers' permission to access parts of the national parks of New Zealand or other natural phenomena, if they intend to pass over backcountry. Hunters can ask for permission from farmers to hunt in their backcountry.

Hazards
The backcountry contains many hazards including rough terrain, life-threatening weather, avalanches, and wild animals. Tragic accidents and dramatic backcountry rescues of stranded hikers, climbers, or skiers are a staple of news reporting.

Some jurisdictions have discussed placing limits on human access to the backcountry during times of particular danger.

See also
 Backcountry skiing
 Backcountry snowboarding
 Backcountry.com
 Backcountry hut
 Badlands
 Bushland
 Countryside
 Desert
 Outback
 Potability of backcountry water
 Wilderness

References

Wilderness areas
Geography terminology